The 6th European Cross Country Championships were held at Velenje in Slovenia on 12 December 1999. Paulo Guerra took his third title in the men's competition and Anita Weyermann won the women's race.

Results

Men individual

79 runners finished

Men teams

Total 15 teams

Women individual

58 runners finished

Women teams

Total 12 teams

Junior Men individual

Junior men teams

Junior women individual

Junior women teams

References

External links 
 Database containing all results between 1994–2007

European Cross Country Championships
European Cross Country Championships
1999 in Slovenian sport
International athletics competitions hosted by Slovenia
Cross country running in Slovenia
December 1999 sports events in Europe